Panos G. Georgopoulos, Ph.D. is a scientist working in the field of Environmental Health and specializing in Mathematical Modeling of Environmental and Biological Systems. He is the architect or the MOdeling ENvironment for Total Risk studies (MENTOR)
 the DOse Response Information and Analysis system (DORIAN), and Prioritization/Ranking of Toxic Exposures with GIS Extension (PRoTEGE), all under continuing development at the Computational Chemodynamics Laboratory of the Environmental and Occupational Health Sciences Institute (EOHSI).

Education
Georgopoulos received a diploma in Chemical Engineering from National Technical University (in Athens, Greece) in 1980.  He then attended the California Institute of Technology, earning a Masters of Science in 1982 and a PhD in 1986.

Professional career

Georgopoulos has been a faculty member at Rutgers University since 1989. He has held teaching positions in the department of environmental sciences, the department of chemical and biochemical engineering, and the department of environmental and occupational health.  He is also a member of the Environmental and Occupational Health Sciences Institute in Piscataway, New Jersey, and has served as director of the institute's occupational chemodynamics laboratory and its ozone research center. He has also served as director for the Informatics and Computational Toxicology Core of the NIEHS Center for Environmental Exposures and Disease at EOHSI, and is an associate member of the Rutgers Cancer Institute. In 2010, he became co-director of the Environmental Bioinformatics and Computational Toxicology Center, a Rutgers - Princeton - USFDA Research Consortium.

Georgopoulos served as the associate editor of the Journal of the Air and Waste Management Association from 1995 to 2001. In 2012 he was awarded the USEPA Scientific and Technological Achievement Award (2012) for Probabilistic Exposure Modeling for Arsenic and Methyl Mercury to Inform Regulatory and Community Decision Making.

Selected publications

 Landrigan P.J., Lioy P.J., Thurston G., Berkowitz G., Chen L.C., Chillrud S.N., Gavett S.H., Georgopoulos P.G., Geyh A.S., Levin S., Perera F., Rappaport S.M. and Small C. (2004). Health and environmental consequences of the World Trade Center disaster. Environmental Health Perspectives 112 (6): 731–739. 
 Li G., Hu J., Wang S.W., Georgopoulos P.G., Schoendorf J. and Rabitz H. (2006). Random Sampling-High Dimensional Model Representation (RS-HDMR) and orthogonality of its different order component functions. Journal of Physical Chemistry A 110 (7): 2474–2485. 
 Broday D. and Georgopoulos P.G. (2001). Growth and deposition of hygroscopic particulate matter in the human lungs. Aerosol Science and Technology 34: 144–159. 
 Georgopoulos P.G., Wang S.W., Vyas V.M., Sun Q., Burke J., Vedantham R., McCurdy T. and Ozkaynak H. (2005). A source-to-dose assessment of population exposures to fine PM and ozone in Philadelphia, PA, during a summer 1999 episode. Journal of Exposure Analysis and Environmental Epidemiology 15 (5): 439−457. 
 Balakrishnan S., Roy A., Ierapetritou M.G., Flach G.P. and Georgopoulos P.G. (2003). Uncertainty reduction and characterization for complex environmental fate and transport models: An empirical Bayesian framework incorporating the stochastic response surface method. Water Resources Research 39 (12): 1350. 
 Georgopoulos P.G., Wang S.W., Vyas V.M., Sun Q., Burke J., Vedantham R., McCurdy T. and Ozkaynak H. (2005). A source-to-dose assessment of population exposures to fine PM and ozone in Philadelphia, PA, during a summer 1999 episode. Journal of Exposure Analysis and Environmental Epidemiology 15 (5): 439−457. 
 Georgopoulos P.G., Roy A., Yonone-Lioy M.J., Opiekun R.E. and Lioy P.J. (2002). Environmental Dynamics and Human Exposure to Copper Volume 1: Environmental Dynamics and Human Exposure Issues. New York, NY, International Copper Association. , 
 Georgopoulos P.G., Wang S.W., Vyas V.M., Lioy P.J., Tan H.C., Georgopoulos I.G. and Yonnone-Lioy J. (2002). Environmental Dynamics and Human Exposure to Copper Volume 2: Framework and Data Sources for Assessing Human Exposure to Copper in the United States. New York, NY, International Copper Association. ,

References

External links
 Computational Chemodynamics Laboratory
 environmental bioinformatics and Computational Toxicology Center
 Elytis Chair Fund
 List of Georgopoulos' Publications (Rutgers University)

Living people
Greek emigrants to the United States
California Institute of Technology alumni
Rutgers University faculty
University of Medicine and Dentistry of New Jersey faculty
Year of birth missing (living people)